Damnazes (died 522) was a 6th-century king of Lazica (western Georgia), a contemporary of the Sassanid king of Iran Kavadh I. Damnazes, like other kings of Late Antique Lazica, is mentioned by the contemporary chronicles in the context of the rivalry between the Eastern Roman (Byzantine) Empire and Sassanid Iran in the Caucasus.  

Damnazes was the father and predecessor of Tzathius, king of the Lazi according to the Byzantine historian John Malalas. The anonymous Chronicon Paschale (Chron. Pasch. s.a. 522) renders his name as Zamnaxes. According to a genealogical hypothesis by Professor Cyril Toumanoff, Damnazes might have been a son of the Lazic king Gubazes I, who is known to have had his son as co-ruler  456.

Damnazes was a subject of the Sassanid king and, although ruling over a Christian country, professed Zoroastrianism. On his death, his son and successor, Tzathius, rejected an Iranian coronation and repaired to Constantinople to have his accession validated by the Byzantine emperor Justin I.

References

Sources

5th-century births
522 deaths
6th-century rulers in Europe
Kings of Lazica
Zoroastrian rulers
Vassal rulers of the Sasanian Empire